Nassarius luridus is a species of sea snail, a marine gastropod mollusk in the family Nassariidae, the Nassa mud snails or dog whelks.

Description
The shell size varies between 12 mm and 20 mm.

Distribution
This species occurs in the Indo-West Pacific off Indonesia.

References

 Cernohorsky W. O. (1984). Systematics of the family Nassariidae (Mollusca: Gastropoda). Bulletin of the Auckland Institute and Museum 14: 1–356

External links
 Gastropods.com : Nassarius (Telasco) luridus; accessed : 28 February 2011

Nassariidae
Gastropods described in 1850